Sir Harry Henry Ognall,  (9 January 193413 April 2021) was an English High Court judge, barrister and author.

Family and early life

Ognall was born in Salford into a middle-class Jewish family, and grew up in Leeds. Ognall's father was journalist and crime author Leopold Horace Ognall, known by the pen name Hartley Howard. He was named Harry Henry after his grandfather, who had died one month before he was born. His father was born in Canada but grew up in Glasgow, where his grandfather served as mayor of Rutherglen. His great-grandparents, Lazarus Ognall and Rachael Rosenstein, were Russian Jews who emigrated to Glasgow.

He was educated at Leeds Grammar School. In 1953, Ognall went to Lincoln College, Oxford to read law, and attended the University of Virginia School of Law on scholarship.

Career

Ognall was called to the bar at Gray's Inn in 1958 and took silk in 1973. He was a recorder from 1972–86, when he was appointed to the High Court.

Ognall is best known for his prosecution of Peter Sutcliffe, dubbed the Yorkshire Ripper, for 13 murders in the 1970s and 1980s. As Queen's Counsel for the Crown's prosecution of Sutcliffe, Ognall was strongly opposed to Sutcliffe's defence strategy of claiming mental illness, which the Crown's psychiatric experts had been prepared to support.

As a judge, he presided over the first trial for the murder of Rachel Nickell, in which he ruled that the police had shown "excessive zeal” and had tried to incriminate Stagg by “deceptive conduct of the grossest kind".

Ognall also presided over the Lyme Bay kayaking tragedy trial; and the trial of Nigel Cox, the first doctor brought to trial in the UK for practising euthanasia.

He was knighted in March 1986. He was appointed a Deputy Lieutenant of West Yorkshire in August 2000.

Personal life
In 1977, Sir Harry married Elizabeth Young in Bradford. They had five children and eight grandchildren. He resided in the Yorkshire Dales.

In popular culture
Ognall was portrayed by actor Simon Kunz in 2021 miniseries Deceit, which retold the story of Operation Edzell following the murder of Rachel Nickell.

Bibliography

References

External links

1934 births
2021 deaths
English Jews
British people of Russian-Jewish descent
People from Salford
University of Virginia School of Law alumni
People educated at Leeds Grammar School
Alumni of Lincoln College, Oxford
Members of Gray's Inn
Knights Bachelor
Queen's Bench Division judges
English barristers
English memoirists
Deputy Lieutenants of West Yorkshire